Fabrice Meunier is a French paralympic archer. He won the silver medal in the Men's individual recurve event at the 2008 Summer Paralympics in Beijing.

References

External links 
 

Living people
French male archers
Paralympic archers of France
Paralympic silver medalists for France
Paralympic medalists in archery
Archers at the 2008 Summer Paralympics
Medalists at the 2008 Summer Paralympics
Year of birth missing (living people)